The Waiting is a 2020 American romance/horror/comedy written/directed by F.C.Rabbath (Director of A Brilliant Monster). The film stars Nick Leali, Molly Ratermann, David Raizor, Bob Myers, Bill Kelly, Bryan Perritt, Laura Altair, Michelle Feliciano, and Mark A. Marple.

Plot 
Eric Brady, a new hotel employee stumbling upon an open secret. One of the rooms is haunted. Eric decides it's both his and the hotel's best interest to help remove the ghost. However, when he meets the ghost, everything changed.

Cast/Crew 
 Nick Leali as Eric
 Molly Ratermann as Elizabeth
 Laura Altair as Sally
 Bob Myers as Steve
 David Raizor as Sean Davis
 Mark A. Marple as Delacourt
 Michelle Feliciano as Michelle
 Emalie Noelani as Kayla
 Bryan Perritt as TV Host
 Assistant Directors Maxine Beck and Amalie Ostertag
 Production Coordinator Kayla King
 Key Make-Up Paris Gedeon

Theatrical Release 

Plays in theaters March 12, 2021. https://www.cmxcinemas.com/movies/The-Waiting

A 4/5 rating from the famous Starburst magazine. https://www.starburstmagazine.com/reviews/the-waiting

Critical reception 

"The Waiting" Review - That Moment In

The Waiting - Review "Scariest Things"

Movie Reviews

Film Review

Review "The Waiting"

References

Florida filmmaker, on heels of success, wraps production on genre blend ‘The Waiting’

"The Waiting" Interview

External links 
 

2020 horror films